Clokey is a surname. Notable people with the surname include:

 Art Clokey (1921–2010), American pioneer of stop motion clay animation
 Joseph W. Clokey (1890–1960), American educator, organist, and composer
 Walter Francis Clokey (1870–1930), British stained glass artist and manufacturer